Fruit of Life is an album by the Wild Colonials, released in 1994. "Spark" was released as a single and was a radio hit. The band supported the album with a North American tour, including shows with Toad the Wet Sprocket and Grant Lee Buffalo.

Production
Recorded partly at Real World Studios, the album was produced by Tchad Blake. Chad Smith and Pete Thomas contributed to the album. Frontwoman Angela McCluskey wrote or cowrote nine of the album's 10 songs. "Dear Mike" is a homage to Mike Scott. "Don't Explain" is a cover of the Billie Holidays song. "Rainbow" borrows from Carmen.

Critical reception

The Los Angeles Times praised McCluskey's "throaty Scotswoman vocals, and a violin-dominated, Celtic-friendly sound that's warm even by coffeehouse standards." The Record wrote that "the restrained musical backdrop—mostly piano, acoustic guitar and occasional horns—serves McCluskey's rich voice perfectly." The Tampa Tribune deemed Fruit of Life "the freshest debut album since last year's Everybody Else Is Doing It, So Why Can't We? by the Cranberries."

The News Tribune stated that "Irish chanteys, American R&B and folk styles are merged with Middle Eastern and even African rhythms." The State advised: "Call it world folk, more compelling than a cowboy junkie, more tantalizing than 10,000 maniacs." The Republican noted that "much of the lyrical content here is dark, and the music ranges from the deeply brooding to undeniably uplifting."

AllMusic called the album "an inventive pastiche of a variety of folk and pop influences."

Track listing
All songs written by various members of the Wild Colonials except for the Billie Holiday cover "Don't Explain".
 "Girl" (McCluskey/Shark/Cantelon/Roewe) – 6:28
 "Spark" (McCluskey/Shark) – 4:20
 "Heaven & Hell" (McCluskey/Roewe) – 5:20
 "Philadelphia Story" (McCluskey/Shark/Cantelon) – 4:52
 "Mission" (McCluskey/Shark/Cantelon/Roewe/Bernard) – 6:05
 "Alice" (McCluskey/Shark/Cantelon/Roewe) – 4:58
 "Rainbow" (McCluskey/Shark/Cantelon) – 5:12
 "Don't Explain" (Holiday/Herzog) – 6:46
 "Victim" (McCluskey/Shark/Cantelon/Roewe) – 5:59
 "Dear Mike" (McCluskey/Shark/Cantelon/Roewe) – 6:13

Personnel
Angela McCluskey - vocals
Shark - guitars, vocals, percussion
Paul Cantelon - violin, piano, harmonium
Scott Roewe - piano, organ, bass, sax, chanter, didgeridoo, tin whistle

With
Matt Chamberlain - drums, percussion
Pete Thomas - drums, percussion
Joel Virgel Vierset - percussion
Glen C. Holmon - bass
Martin Tillmann - cello
Chad Smith - drums on "Dear Mike"
Julio "Jimmy" Ledezma - drums on "Philadelphia Story"
Pandit Dinesh - tablas on "Victim''
Guy Pratt - bass on "Heaven & Hell"
Erik G. Hanson - percussion on "Heaven & Hell"

Production
Producer: Tchad Blake
Recorded by: Tchad Blake
Additional engineering: John Paterno, James Cadsky, Richard Evans

References

External links
Official website

Wild Colonials albums
1994 debut albums
Geffen Records albums
Albums produced by Tchad Blake